This is a list of destinations that Spirit Airlines serves as of November 2022:

References 

Lists of airline destinations